Pterolophia granulata is a species of beetle in the family Cerambycidae. It was described by Victor Motschulsky in 1866.

References

granulata
Beetles described in 1866